Josh Franklin (born 1967), known as Stash, is an American graffiti artist and graphic designer based in Brooklyn, New York.

Biography
Franklin was born in Long Island, New York in 1967. He grew up in New York City, finding inspiration from a young age looking at illegal Graffiti art on the sides of the city's subway trains while on his way to school.
Later in the early 1980s, Stash started painting trains alongside other artists such as Futura and ZEPHYR. He exhibited at age 17 with pop artists Keith Haring and Jean-Michel Basquiat, and later continued on as a successful gallery artist. He got the name Stash from the colloquial term "stashing", which equates to hiding things. Growing up in a very small home, Franklin felt the need to hide, or "stash" his most valued belongings from his brother.

In 1989, he appeared as a graffiti artist in the feature film Slaves of New York.

By the 1990s, Franklin began collaborating on product designs with high-profile brands such as Nike, Reebok, Casio, and more recently A Bathing Ape, Leica and Uniqlo. He still remains an active graphic designer to this day.
Franklin also created two clothing brands and opened a sneaker shop: Subware, Recon, and Nort/Recon Sneaker shop.

Exhibitions
 2009: Celeritas, SURU Gallery, Hollywood, group
 2011: Blue Brooklyn, Galerie Issue, Paris, solo
 2012: Brooklyn – Berlin, Galleri Jonas Kleerup, Stockholm, group
 2013: NW20 Exhibition, Bape Gallery, Kyoto, group
 2014: SPRAYED IN FULL, The Seventh Letter Flagship and Gallery, Los Angeles, solo

References

External links
 mrstash.co

American graffiti artists
Living people
Artists from New York City
1967 births